Minerve was a diesel–electric submarine in the French Navy, launched in 1961. In January 1968, Minerve was lost with all hands in bad weather while returning to her home port of Toulon.

Minerve sank two days after the submarine  of the Israeli Navy disappeared in the eastern Mediterranean between Crete and Cyprus.

Description
The design was a development of the Aréthuse class, and were required to keep the low noise levels and high manoeuvrability of the smaller submarines, while also keeping a small crew and being easy to maintain.

Displacement was  surfaced and  submerged. The ship's machinery and equipment were modular to ease maintenance.

Minerve was fitted with 12  torpedo tubes, with eight in the bow and four in the stern. No reload torpedoes were carried. The ship had a crew of 45, composed of six officers and 39 enlisted.

Service history
Minerve was ordered under the 1957 French Naval Estimates, was laid down in May 1958 at the Chantiers Dubigeon shipyard in Nantes, and launched on 31 May 1961. After a shakedown cruise to Londonderry Port, Bergen, and Gothenburg in November 1962, the submarine sailed from Cherbourg to Toulon, arriving on 22 December 1962. She was commissioned into the 1st Submarine Squadron on 10 June 1964. Minerve operated solely in the Mediterranean Sea. She was refitted at Missiessy Quay, Toulon, in 1967.

Loss
This proved to be the last time the boat and her crew of six officers and 46 enlistees made contact.

Commander Philipe Bouillot later said that Minerves new captain, Lieutenant de vaisseau André Fauve, had spent 7,000 hours submerged over four years on submarines of the same class and never had a problem. The only factor known that could have caused her to sink was the weather, which was extremely bad at the time of her loss.

The French Navy launched a search for the missing submarine, mobilizing numerous ships, including the aircraft carrier  and the submersible  under the supervision of Jacques Cousteau, but found nothing, and the operation was called off on 2 February 1968. The search for Minerve, under the name Operation Reminer, continued into 1969 and used the submersible Archimède with the U.S. survey ship .

Struggle of the families for the truth
During the years that followed, the families fought to find out what could have happened. The French Navy did not communicate any information on the possible causes of the sinking. The file was classified as "Secret Defense" which means no one could have access to it for 50 years.

After having requested access to the file many times, always refused, Christophe Agnus, son of one of the missing officers, obtained in 2007, at the invitation of Nicolas Sarkozy, an exemption to consult the archives. He discovered nothing. Other families obtained this right, and then suspected the Navy of concealing elements compromising it.

In 2018, the son of the last commander of the Minerve, Hervé Fauve, addressed the President of the French Republic, Emmanuel Macron, to request an early lifting of the defence secrecy on the "Minerve" file. The file has been kept in the archives since 1977, and its declassification should not take place until 50 years after the most recent piece of the file, dated 1970, i.e. in 2020. There is a risk that an automatic renewal of the file will extend this secrecy by 10 years, i.e. 2030 or more. He argues that the file is 'empty' according to those who have consulted it, that no similar submarine is still in use, that it does not contain any element contrary to the security of the state and above all that the families live in hope of this lifting.

This request was examined and the Official Journal of 16 June 2018 announced the declassification of the archives concerning the disappearance of the Minerve.

Relaunch of the search for the wreck 
On 14 October 2018, the Var-Matin a French newspaper published an article in which it informed that, on the initiative of Hervé Fauve, eighteen of the families of the 52 sailors of the Minerve had sent an open letter to various elected representatives of the Toulon harbour to request the resumption of the search for the wreck of the submarine. The submarine was the only missing Western submarine that had not been found since the end of World War II.

Following this publication Hervé Fauve succeeded in mobilising all the families of the crew, active and retired sailors and the French media to support this request.

On 5 February 2019, the Minister of the Armed Forces announced a resumption of the search 50 years after the last campaign.

The discovery of the location of the wreck was found on 21 July 2019 by the company Ocean Infinity using the search ship .

Although Minerves sail was destroyed, identifying the wreckage was possible, as the letters "MINE" and "S" (from Minerve and S647, respectively) were still readable on the hull.

Memorial
On the day of her discovery, 22 July 2019, Squadron Vice-Admiral Charles-Henri du Ché, responsible for the search, declared that the remains of the submarine would be left untouched and would become a maritime sanctuary. A ceremony is to be held in the location where Minerve vanished with the relatives of the submariners in attendance.

In December 2019, Victor Vescovo proposed to Hervé Fauve a dive on the wreck of the Minerve with his two-seat deep-submersible Limiting Factor . The Department of Underwater Archaeological Research (DRASSM), under the administration of the Ministry of Culture, which is responsible for the study and protection of France's submerged heritage organized dives on the Minerve wreck.

On the first dive, 1 February 2020, Vescovo dived with retired French Rear Admiral Jean-Louis Barbier, who was contacted by Hervé Fauve, to gather new information on the cause of the loss. 
On the second dive, 2 February, Vescovo piloted while Hervé Fauve, the son of the submarine's commanding officer, sat in the second seat. At the bottom they placed a granite memorial plaque on a section of Minerves hull at a depth of over  – to a recording of "La Marseillaise". Vescovo later stated, "As a former naval officer, I was very honored to partner with our French allies…"

See also
 List of submarines of France

References

Sources

External links

 
 

1961 ships
Daphné-class submarines of the French Navy
January 1968 events in Europe
Lost submarines of France
Maritime incidents in 1968
Ships built by Chantiers Dubigeon
Ships built in France
Warships lost with all hands
Shipwrecks in the Mediterranean Sea